William L. Distin (August 1789 – September 30, 1879) was a Canadian municipal politician. He was mayor of Hamilton, Ontario in 1849.

Born in England, little is known of the life of William L. Distin.  He first appears as an active member of the Hamilton community in 1849, when he was elected mayor and served on the building committee of Christ's Church.  From 1849 until 1853 he was chairman of the board of trustees for Common Schools, and in that capacity he presided at the opening of Central School 2 May 1853.  A supporter of Sir Allan MacNab, he is believed to have lived on King Street West, until his death in 1858.

References
 Dictionary of Hamilton Biography (Vol I, 1791–1875); Thomas Melville Bailey; W.L. Griffin Ltd, (1981); Pg 61

1789 births
1879 deaths
Mayors of Hamilton, Ontario